Yuanxing is an original Tajima strain's breed of Taiwanese beef cattle. The breed has originally 19 heads of cattle, and is currently raised in Hualien.

References

Beef cattle breeds
Cattle breeds originating in Japan